The White Handkerchief is a 1998 short Nigerian film produced and directed by Tunde Kelani and starring Yemi Komolafe, Yemi Shodimu, and Khabirat Kafidipe.
The film was adapted from The Virgin, a debut novel of Bayo Adebowale.

Plot summary
The film tells the story of a young village girl called Awero, played by Sola Asedeko, who lost her virginity as a result of rape before she met her childhood love, called Odejimi, whom she decides to marry. Odejimi must use a white handkerchief  to evidence the virginal blood of Awero on their wedding night as required by tradition. Odejimi is disappointed when no blood is produced and this results in a war between the villagers of Awero and Odejimi.

Cast
Sola Asedeko
Idowu Philips
Khabirat Kafidipe
Yemi Shodimu
Akinwunmi Isola
Yemi Komolafe

References

Nigerian short films
1998 films
Films directed by Tunde Kelani
1990s English-language films
English-language Nigerian films